The 2023 Wisconsin Supreme Court election will be held on Tuesday, April 4, 2023, to elect a justice to the Wisconsin Supreme Court for a ten-year term. Milwaukee County circuit judge Janet Protasiewicz and former Wisconsin Supreme Court justice Daniel Kelly advanced from the February 21 nonpartisan primary, receiving 46% and 24%, respectively. Although Wisconsin Supreme Court justices are officially nonpartisan, Kelly is identified as a conservative and Protasiewicz as a liberal.

Incumbent justice Patience Roggensack is retiring after 20 years on the court; she has identified as a conservative and voted consistently with the conservative 4–3 majority on the court.  Other candidates in the 2023 primary included conservative Waukesha County circuit judge Jennifer Dorow and liberal Dane County circuit judge Everett Mitchell.

The race will determine the ideological balance of the court for at least the next two years. Wisconsin Democratic Party chair Ben Wikler called it "the most important election nobody's ever heard of." The outcome could determine how the court rules on future cases involving abortion rights, voting rights, and redistricting. Additionally, because the court rejected Donald Trump's false claims of fraud in the 2020 presidential election, the outcome of this race could determine how the court rules if a similar attempt is made to overturn the 2024 election. The election has been described as the most important 2023 U.S. election. Three weeks before the election it had already become the most expensive judicial race in history.

Primary election

Candidates

Advanced
 Daniel Kelly, former Wisconsin Supreme Court justice
 Janet Protasiewicz, Milwaukee County circuit court judge

Eliminated in primary
 Jennifer Dorow, Waukesha County circuit court judge
 Everett Mitchell, Dane County circuit court judge

Fundraising

Advertising
On January 20, 2023, Janet Protasiewicz became the first candidate to announce a purchase of TV ads, allocating $700,000 for ads to air in the three weeks leading up to the February 21 primary. The ads, which began airing on January 26, highlight Protasiewicz's support for abortion rights and feature women warning “extremists want to ban abortion. Even in cases of rape and health of the mother.” Fair Courts America, a conservative advocacy group funded by megadonors Richard and Elizabeth Uihlein, simultaneously spent $250,000 on radio ads in support of Daniel Kelly. Fair Courts America then launched a $500,000 TV ad campaign in support of Kelly on February 2. The ads warn “Madison liberals are trying to take over the Wisconsin Supreme Court. That’s why we need to elect conservative Justice Dan Kelly.” Fair Courts America later increased their advertising budget for Kelly to $2.4 million.

Also in early February, the progressive group A Better Wisconsin Together announced a purchase of ads opposing Jennifer Dorow, including $720,000 for TV ads and $110,000 for digital ads. They later increased their ad budget to $1.9 million. The ads accuse Dorow of having "a long history of keeping criminals, even sexual predators, out of prison." Daily Kos theorized that A Better Wisconsin Together, which is affiliated with the national group ProgressNow, believed that Dorow would be more difficult to defeat and was trying to prevent her from reaching the April general election. On the same day, Dorow announced her first TV ad campaign, a $60,000 buy highlighting her service in the trial of Darrell Brooks. Dorow later increased her ad spending to $400,000, and the advocacy group Conservative Action for America followed up with a $246,000 buy in support of her.

Protasiewicz released two additional ads on February 7 which stress her support for fairness and public safety and poke fun at the difficulty of pronouncing her surname. Two conservative groups, Wisconsin Alliance for Reform and Wisconsin Manufacturers & Commerce, simultaneously spent a combined $770,000 on a commercial portraying Protasiewicz as weak on crime. Protasiewicz hit back on February 10 with an ad defending her history as a prosecutor and accusing Dorow and Kelly of representing child predators during their time as defense attorneys. This brought her total ad spending to $1.25 million. Protasiewicz's fundraising advantage allowed her to run an ad during the 2023 Super Bowl, the only candidate in the race to do so.

On February 14, Women Speak Out PAC, which is affiliated with Susan B. Anthony Pro-Life America, announced it would spend "six figures" on pro-Kelly ads highlighting his opposition to abortion. Kelly and Everett Mitchell did not air any ads themselves, and no outside groups ran ads in support of Mitchell. In total, over $9 million was spent in the primary.

Endorsements

Forums

Primary results
Observers saw the February 21 primary as a contest between Kelly and Dorow, as Protasiewicz was widely expected to win a plurality. Kelly won second place over Dorow through his commanding victories in Wisconsin's rural areas. Dorow was strongest in the vote-rich Milwaukee suburbs, but found little support outside of southeast Wisconsin. The two more liberal candidates won a combined 54% of the vote, while the two more conservative candidates won a combined 46% of the vote.

General election

Advertising
Two days after the primary election, Janet Protasiewicz spent at least $135,000 on two new ads. The first continues her previous criticism of Daniel Kelly for representing child predators as a defense attorney, while the second claims he would uphold Wisconsin's current abortion ban if elected to the Supreme Court. A Better Wisconsin Together simultaneously booked an additional $500,000 worth of ads in support of Protasiewicz. Protasiewicz's ad spending quickly swelled; by February 27, it had reached $5.4 million. A Better Wisconsin later increased their ad budget to $1.3 million, with one ad hitting Kelly for a past comment he made comparing social security to slavery. On March 6, Protasiewicz spent an additional $460,000 on ads. One of her ads claimed that Kelly had taken a bribe to un-recuse himself from a case, an accusation that Kelly denied. Another ad accused him of participating in plans to appoint fake electors in 2020 due to Donald Trump's false claims of fraud in the presidential election.

On February 27, Fair Courts America booked close to $1 million worth of ads labeling Protasiewicz as soft on crime. Fair Courts America booked another $550,000 worth of ads on March 6. Meanwhile, the conservative group Wisconsin Manufacturers & Commerce spent $3.2 million in its opening buy, running ads accusing Protasiewicz of issuing low sentences in sexual assault cases.

As of March 7, liberal groups had spent nearly twice as much as conservative groups in the general election. Protasiewicz had spent over $7 million, buoyed by an additional $1.7 million from A Better Wisconsin Together; Kelly had not aired any ads himself, instead relying on $3.2 million from Wisconsin Manufacturers & Commerce and $1.7 million from Fair Courts America. By March 15, Protasiewicz had spent $9.1 million and A Better  Wisconsin Together had spent $2 million while Kelly still had yet to purchase any ads, though Wisconsin Manufacturers & Commerce had spent $3.4 million and Fair Courts America had spent $2.3 million. There have been three times as many Protasiewicz ads on TV compared to Kelly ads, as ad rates are significantly cheaper for candidates than they are for PACs.

Endorsements
Endorsements in bold were made after the primary election.

Results

See also
 2023 Wisconsin elections

Notes

References

External links
 Dorow campaign website
 Kelly campaign website
 Mitchell campaign website
 Protasiewicz campaign website

Wisconsin Supreme Court elections
supreme court